() is an Irish and Scottish male given name, of Hebrew origin via Latin. It is the Irish equivalent of the name James. The name James is the English New Testament variant for the Hebrew name Jacob. Jacob. Its meaning in Hebrew is "one who supplants" or more literally "one who grabs at the heel". When the Hebrew patriarch Jacob was born, he was grasping his twin brother Esau's heel.

Other variant spellings in Irish include ,  and Seumus. It has also been anglicised as Shaymus, Seamus, Seamas, Sheamus and Shamus.

In the United States, the word "Shamus" was a derogatory slang misspelling of Séamus that arose during the 19th century as more than 4.5 million Irish immigrated to America, peaking at almost two million between 1845 and 1852 during the Great Famine (Irish: An Gorta Mór). Irish immigrants found employment in the police departments, fire departments and other public services of major cities, largely in the Northeast and around the Great Lakes, and have been overrepresented in the New York police since then. Though still used by some as a derogatory term, the great preponderance of Irish and Irish-American law enforcement officers led to a persisting stereotype, and the name "Shamus" continues to refer to Irish-American police and private detectives.

Given name
 Seamus, Stuart / Stewart Kings of Scotland from James I to James VI
 Sheamus (born 1978), ring name of Irish professional wrestler Stephen Farrelly
 Séamus Bannon (1927–1990), Irish retired sportsman
 Séamus Barron (born 1945), Irish retired hurler
 Seamus Blackley (born 1967 or 1968), American physicist, talent agent, and co-creator of the original Xbox console
 Seamus Blake (born 1970), tenor saxophonist
 Seamus Bohan, Irish independent politician
 Seamus Bonner (1948–2012), Irish sportsperson
 Séamus Bourke (hurler) (born 1957), Irish retired hurler 
 Seamus Boxley (born 1982), former American former professional basketball player
 Séamus Brennan (1948–2008), Irish politician and Minister for Arts, Sport & Tourism
 Séamus Burke (1893–1967), Irish politician
 Séamus Butler (born 1980), Irish sportsperson
 Seamus Cahill, Irish born greyhound trainer
 Séamus Callanan (born 1988), Irish hurler
 Seamus Carey, American philosopher and academic
 Séamus Casey (born 1997), Irish hurler 
 Seamus Clancy, Gaelic footballer
 Seamus Clandillon (1878–1944), Irish musician and civil servant
 Séamus Cleere, (born 1940), Irish retired hurler
 Seamus Close (1947–2019), Northern Irish politician
 Séamus Coen (born 1958), Irish retired hurler
 Seamus Coffey, Irish economist and media contributor
 Séamus Coleman (born 1988), Irish footballer
 Seamus Conley (born 1976), American artist 
 Seamus Conneely (born 1988), English footballer
 Seamus Costello (1939–1977), Irish activist
 Séamus Coughlan (1953–2013), Irish Gaelic footballer 
 Séamus Cullimore (born 1954), Irish politician
 Séamus Cullinane (1933–2002), Irish hurler 
 Séamus Cunningham (born 1942), Irish Catholic Bishop of Hexham and Newcastle
 Seamus Daly, Irish republican
 Séamus Darby (born 1950), Irish former Gaelic football player
 Seamus Davey-Fitzpatrick (born 1998), American actor
 Séamus de Brún (1911–2003), Irish senator and Irish-language promoter
 Seamus Deakin (1874–1952), Irish nationalist 
 Seamus Deane (1940–2021), Irish poet, novelist, critic and historian
 Seamus Dever (born 1976), American actor
 Séamus Dolan (1914–2010), Irish politician
 Seamus Donnelly (footballer) (born 1971), Irish retired footballer
 Séamus Downey (born 1960), former cyclist from Northern Ireland
 Seamus Downey, Irish Gaelic footballer
 Séamus Doyle (1885–1971), Irish politician
 Seamus Dunne (1930–2016), Irish professional footballer
 Séamus Durack (born 1951), Irish former hurler and manager
 Séamus Dwyer (1886–1922), Irish politician
 Séamus Egan (judge) (1923–2004), Irish judge and barrister
 Séamus Egan (born 1969), Irish musician
 Seamus Elliott (1934–1971), Irish bicycle racer
 Séamus Ennis (1919–1982), Irish musician, singer and music collector
 Seamus Finnegan (born 1949), Northern Irish playwright
 Séamus Fitzgerald (1896–1972), Irish politician
 Séamus Flanagan (born 1997), Irish hurler
 Seamus Fogarty, Irish singer-songwriter
 Séamus Freeman (1944-2022), Irish Roman Catholic Bishop 
 Séamus Gardiner (1894–1976), Irish president of the Gaelic Athletic Association 
 Seamus Gibson, retired Irish sportsperson
 Séamus Gillen (born 1947), Irish retired hurler
 Seamus Grew (1951–1982), Irish volunteer in the Irish National Liberation Army
 Seamus Haji (born 1968), English DJ and record producer
 Séamus Harnedy (born 1990), Irish hurler
 Séamus Healy (born 1950), Irish politician
 Seamus Heaney (1939–2013), Nobel Prize–winning Irish poet, writer and lecturer
 Séamus Hearne (1932–2008), Irish hurler
 Seamus Heath (born 1961), Northern Irish former association football midfielder and coach
 Séamus Heery (1927–2014), Irish Gaelic footballer 
 Séamus Hegarty (1940–2019), Irish Catholic prelate
 Séamus Henchy (1917–2009), Irish judge, barrister and academic
 Séamus Hennessy (born 1989), Irish hurler
 Seamus Henry (born 1949), Northern Ireland-born former member of the Legislative Assembly of the Northwest Territories, Canada
 Séamus Herron (born 1934), Irish former cyclist
 Séamus Hetherton (1930–2019), Irish Gaelic footballer
 Séamus Hickey (born 1987), Irish sportsperson
 Seamus Hoare, Irish former Gaelic footballer
 Séamus Hogan (born c. 1947), Irish retired sportsperson
 Séamus Horgan (born 1946), Irish retired hurler
 Seamus Hughes (trade unionist) (1881–1943), Irish trade unionist, revolutionary, composer, and public servant
 Séamus Hughes (born 1952), Irish judge and politician
 Séamus Keely (1889–1974), Irish politician
 Seamus Kelly (footballer) (born 1974), Irish former footballer
 Seamus Kelly (rugby union) (born 1991), American former rugby union player
 Séamus Kennedy (cyclist) (1947–2012), Irish cyclist
 Seamus Kennedy (singer) (born 1964), Irish singer, comedian and writer
 Séamus Kennedy (hurler) (born 1993), Irish Gaelic footballer and hurler
 Séamus Kenny (born 1980), Irish Gaelic footballer
 Séamus Kirk (born 1945), Irish politician
 Seamus Kotyk (born 1980), Canadian ice hockey coach and former goaltender
 Séamus Lagan (1947–2018), Irish Gaelic footballer
 Seamus Leydon, Gaelic footballer
 Séamus Looney (born 1950), Irish former sportsperson
 Seamus Ludlow (1929–1976), Irish forester and murder victim
 Seamus Lynch (born 1945), former Irish republican and socialist politician
 Séamus Mac an Iomaire (1891–1967), Irish botanist and writer
 Séamus Mac Cathmhaoil, Anglican Archbishop of Cashel
 Seamus Mac Cruitín (1815–1870), Irish poet and bard
 Séamus Mac Dhòmhnaill, 6th of Dunnyveg (died 1565), Scottish Clan Chief
 Séamus Mac Gearailt (born 1945), Irish retired Gaelic football trainer, coach, selector and former player
 Séamus mac Pilib Mac Mathghamhna (died 1519), Bishop of Derry
 Seamus MacBennett (1925–1995), footballer
 Séamus Mackey (born 1938), retired Irish sportsperson
 Seamus Malin (born 1940), Irish former journalist
 Seamus Mallon (1936–2020), Irish politician: Senator, MP, MLA, and deputy First Minister of Northern Ireland
 Seamus Mallon (rugby union) (born 1980), Irish former professional rugby union player
 Seamus Maloney, former Australian rules footballer
 Seamus Martin (born 1942), retired journalist and broadcasting administrator
 Seamus McCaffery (born 1950), American judge, Pennsylvania Supreme Court justice
 Seamus McCallion, Irish former professional rugby league footballer 
 Seamus McCarthy, Ireland's Comptroller and Auditor General
 Séamus McCarthy (born 1954), Irish former Gaelic footballer
 Seamus McDonagh (boxer), actor, screenwriter, filmmaker and retired boxer
 Séamus McElwaine (1960–1986), volunteer in Provisional Irish Republican Army 
 Séamus McEnaney, Gaelic football manager and businessman
 Séamus McFerran (1916–1968), president of the Gaelic Athletic Association
 Seamus McGarvey (born 1967), Northern Irish cinematographer
 Seamus McGrane (died 2019), Irish dissident republican
 Seamus McGrath (born 1976), Canadian retired professional mountain biker
 Seamus McGraw, American journalist and author
 Séamus McGuinness (1930–2008), Irish Gaelic footballer 
 Seamus McGuire, Irish fiddle player
 Séamus McHugh (born 1956), Irish Gaelic footballer
 Seamus McIntyre (1971–2001), Irish sportsperson
 Seamus McKee, Northern Irish broadcaster
 Seamus McMurphy (c. 1720–1750), Irish poet and rapparee
 Seamus McNamara (born 1985), American-born former Australian rules footballer 
 Seamus McSporran (born 1938), Scottish retired worker in multiple jobs on the Isle of Gigha
 Seamus Metress (born 1933), American academic
 Séamus Moore (politician) (died 1940), Irish politician and businessman
 Seamus Moore (singer) (born 1947), Irish singer
 Seamus Moynihan, Irish former Gaelic footballer
 Seamus Murphy (1907–1975), Irish sculptor
 Séamus Murphy (Gaelic footballer) (born 1938), Irish former sportsperson
 Séamus Murphy (Wexford hurler) (born 1950s), retired Irish hurling manager and former player
 Séamus Murphy (Carlow hurler) (born 1986), Irish hurler
 Seamus Noonan, Irish lawyer
 Séamus Ó Braonáin (1881–1970), Irish sportsman and public servant
 Séamus Ó Duilearga (1899–1980), Irish folklorist and academic
 Séamus Ó Fearghail (fl. 1711–1718), Irish poet and scribe
 Séamus Ó Grianna (1889–1969), Irish writer
 Seamus Ó hÉilidhe (died 1595), Irish clergyman
 Séamus Ó hEocha (1880–1959), Irish educator 
 Séamus P. Ó Mórdha (1915–2005), Irish teacher and historian
 Séamus Ó Néill (1910–1981), Irish writer
 Séamus Ó Riain (1916–2007), Irish GAA player and administrator
 Séamus Ó Siaghail (fl. 1636?), Irish scribe
 Séamus Ó Súilleabháin (fl. 1849), Irish scribe, writer and translator
 Seamus O'Connell (1930–2013) was an English amateur footballer
 Seamus O'Connor (born 1997), American-born snowboarder
 Séamus O'Doherty (1882–1945), Irish republican
 Seamus O'Donovan (1896–1979), Irish explosives expert and leading volunteer in the Irish Republican Army
 Séamus O'Farrell (died 1973), Irish politician and journalist
 Séamus O'Malley (1903–2002), Irish Gaelic footballer and Gaelic games administrator
 Seamus O'Neill (Gaelic footballer) (born 1982), Gaelic footballer
 Seamus O'Regan (born 1971), Canadian broadcast journalist
 Séamus O'Shea (born 1987), Gaelic footballer
 Séamus Pattison (1936–2018), Irish politician
 Séamus Plunkett (born 1961), Irish retired hurler
 Séamus Power (Waterford hurler) (1929–2016), Irish sportsperson
 Séamus Power (Tipperary hurler) (born 1952), Irish retired sportsperson
 Séamus Power (golfer) (born 1987), Irish professional golfer
 Séamus Prendergast (born 1980), Irish hurler 
 Seamus Quaid (1937–1980), Irish police officer killed by the IRA
 Séamus Qualter (born 1967), Irish retired hurler and hurling manager
 Seamus Quinn, former Gaelic footballer
 Seamus Rafter (1873–1918), Irish Republican
 Séumas Robinson (Irish republican) (1890–1961), Irish rebel and politician
 Seamus Robinson (fencer) (born 1975), Australian fencer
 Séamus Roche (born 1969), Irish retired sportsperson and referee
 Seamus Ross (born 1957), academic and researcher based in Canada
 Séamus Ryan (1895–1933), member of 
 Séamus Ryan (hurler), Irish priest, lecturer and hurler
 Seamus Ryan (photographer) (born 1964), Irish-born photographer
 Séamus Scanlon (born 1981), Irish Gaelic footballer
 Séamus Shinnors (born 1945), retired Irish sportsperson
 Seamus Tansey (born 1943), Irish flute player
 Seamus Treacy, Northern Irish lawyer
 Seamus Twomey (1919–1989), Irish republican
 Séamus Whelan (born 1938), Irish former sportsperson
 Séamus Woulfe (born 1962), Irish lawyer

References

See also
 James (name)
 Jacob (name)

Gaelic-language given names
Irish masculine given names
Irish-language masculine given names